The 1938–39 season was the 42nd in the history of the Western Football League.

The Division One champions for the second time were Lovells Athletic, after finishing bottom the previous season. The winners of Division Two for the second consecutive season were Trowbridge Town. There was again no promotion or relegation between the two divisions this season, and the league was restructured before the 1939–40 season following the outbreak of World War II.

Division One
Division One was increased from five to six clubs, with one new club joining:

Bath City, rejoining after leaving the league in 1936.

Division Two
Division Two remained at eighteen clubs with no clubs leaving or joining.

References

1938-39
4